Parliamentary elections were held in the Kingdom of Croatia-Slavonia on September 16–19, 1884. The People's Party emerged as the victor.

According to the 1881 electoral law, the franchise was limited to males over 24 years of age who paid at least ƒ15 in taxes.

Results

Sources
Ferdo Šišić: Pregled povijesti hrvatskoga naroda, Matica Hrvatska, Zagreb 1975.

Elections in Croatia
Croatia
1884 in Croatia
Elections in Austria-Hungary
September 1884 events
Kingdom of Croatia-Slavonia
Election and referendum articles with incomplete results